George William Bailey (born August 27, 1944) is an American actor. Although he appeared in many dramatic roles, he may be best remembered for his "crusty" comedic characters such as Staff Sergeant Luther Rizzo in M*A*S*H (TV series 1979–1983); Lieutenant/Captain Thaddeus Harris in the Police Academy films (1984–1994), and Captain Felix Maxwell in Mannequin (1987). He played the role of Detective Lieutenant Louie Provenza on TNT's television crime drama The Closer, and its spinoff series Major Crimes, from 2005 to 2018.

Biography
Bailey was born in Port Arthur, Texas. He went to Thomas Jefferson High School in Port Arthur with Janis Joplin and Jimmy Johnson. He started college at Lamar University in nearby Beaumont and transferred to Texas Tech University in Lubbock.

Bailey left college and spent the mid-1960s working at local theater companies before moving to California in the mid-1970s. He broke into television with a small recurring role as a crime scene police officer on the short-lived detective show Harry O. He then landed one-shot episodic roles on television programs of the day such as Starsky and Hutch and Charlie's Angels. His film debut was in A Force of One (1979), an early Chuck Norris film. By the late 1970s, he got his breakout role as the conniving, cigar-chomping goldbricker Sgt. Luther Rizzo in M*A*S*H. He also appeared as Tom Berenger's sidekick in Rustler's Rhapsody (1985).

He returned to college in 1993, and graduated from Southwest Texas State University, now Texas State, in San Marcos, Texas in May 1993, with a Bachelor of Fine Arts, Theatre. For the 1999–2000 school year, he was the Artist-in-Residence.

In the late 1990s, he starred in three of the seventeen television films and miniseries in the Bible Collection series produced for the TNT television network, Solomon (1997), Jesus (1999), and Paul (2000).

From 2001 to 2019, Bailey served as the Executive Director of the Sunshine Kids Foundation, which provides trips and activities for hundreds of young cancer patients annually. He first volunteered with the organization after his goddaughter was diagnosed with leukemia.

Filmography (film and TV)

 Charlie's Angels (1976, S1 E10: "Consenting Adults") - Mumford 
 How The West Was Won (1977, S1 E2: "Erika") - Ivie
 CHiPs (1978, TV Series, S1 E14: "Rustling") - Drunk Driver
 Starsky & Hutch (1976-1978) - Hotel Clerk / Slade 
 Soap (1978, TV Series) - The Hobo
 Laverne & Shirley (1979, S4 E23: "There's a Spy in My Beer") - Rocko 
 A Force of One (1979) - Erwin
 Lou Grant (1979) - Water Man / Arlo Karp 
 Happy Days (1979, S7 E9: "Joanie Busts Out") - Jack Whitman 
 The French Atlantic Affair (1979, TV Mini-Series) - Jake (uncredited)
 Angie (1979, S2 E11: "Mary, Mary Marries")
 Benson (1979–1980) - Bartender / Gus
 Palmerstown, U.S.A. (1980, S1 E5: "The Black Travelers: II")
 Alcatraz: The Whole Shocking Story (1980, TV Series) - Holfeld
 Flo (1980–1981) - Lonnie Castleberry / Bull 
 Murder in Texas (1981, TV film) - Richard 'Racehorse' Haynes
 Bitter Harvest (1981, TV film) - Lazlo 
 Fog (1981, TV film) - Mr. Carrion
 Hardcase (1981, TV film) - Paul Morgan 
 The Capture of Grizzly Adams (1982, TV film) - Tom Quigley 
 M*A*S*H (1979–1983, TV Series) - Sergeant Luther Rizzo / The G.I.
 St. Elsewhere (1982-1983, TV Series) - Dr. Hugh Beale
 Murder, She Wrote (1984) - Lt. Thibodeau 
 Simon & Simon (1984) - Police Chief Don Potter / Dr. Kyle Stepney - Surgery
 Police Academy (1984) - Lt. Thaddeus Harris
 Earthlings (1984, TV Series) - Bobo
 Runaway (1984) - Chief
 Police Academy 2: Their First Assignment (1985) - Wedding Guest (uncredited)
 Rustlers' Rhapsody (1985) - Peter
 Warning Sign (1985) - Tom Schmidt
 Short Circuit (1986) - Captain Skroeder
 Mannequin (1987) - Felix
 Burglar (1987) - Ray Kirschman
 Police Academy 4: Citizens on Patrol (1987) - Capt. Thaddeus Harris
 Hawaiian Dream (1987) - Captain Pierce
 Police Academy 5: Assignment Miami Beach (1988) - Capt. Thaddeus Harris
 War and Remembrance (1988, TV Series) - Cmdr. Jim Grigg
 Police Academy 6: City Under Siege (1989) - Capt. Thaddeus Harris
 The Gifted One (1989, TV film) - Dr. Winslow 
 Love and Lies (1990, TV film) - Sgt. Halsey 
 Q&A (1990) - Bartender (uncredited)
 Doublecrossed (1991) - Camp
 Under Cover (1991, TV Series) - Director Waugh
 Write to Kill (1991) - Dean Sutton
 A Mother's Justice (1991, TV film) - Joe Comminger
 Before the Storm (1991, TV film) - Director Waugh
 Bed of Lies (1992, TV film) - Zeke Zbranek 
 Dinosaurs (1992, S2 E20: "Nuts to War: Part 2") - Sarge
 An American Story - The Battle of Athens (1992, TV film) - Tom Cantrell
 Dead Before Dawn (1993, TV film) - Masterson
 No Child of Mine (1993, TV film) - Lamar Jenkins 
 Police Academy: Mission to Moscow (1994) - Capt. Thaddeus Harris
 The Siege at Ruby Ridge (1996, TV film) - Ralph Coulter
 Seduction in a Small Town (1997, TV film) - Pat Carter
 The Jeff Foxworthy Show (1996–1997, Series) - Big Jim Foxworthy
 Solomon (1997) - Azarel
 Jesus (1999) - Livio
 Brothers. Dogs. And God. (2000) - Luther Graham
 St. Paul (2000) -Barnabas
 The Thin Blue Lie (2000) - K.C.
 Scorcher (2002) - General Timothy Moore
 Home on the Range (2004) - Rusty, the Dog (voice)
 Nip/Tuck (2005) - Wesley Kringle
 The Closer (2005–2012, TV Series) - Lt. Louie Provenza
 Cake: A Wedding Story (2007) - Howard Canter
 Left Turn Yield (2007) - Man at Crosswalk with Dog
 Johnny's Gone (2011) - Chet
 The Newest Pledge (2012) - Mr. Hodgkinson
 Cupcake Wars Guest Judge (2012)
 I Am Death (2013) - The Killer
 Highly Functional (2017) - Dan
 Major Crimes (2012–2018, TV Series) - Lt. Louie Provenza
 Til Life Do Us Part (2020, short film) - Barnaby Barnes
 Stargirl (2022, 1 episode) - Mr. Dugan

References

External links

The Sunshine Kids
 G.W. Bailey - Museum of the Gulf Coast, Port Arthur, TX

1944 births
Male actors from Texas
American male film actors
American male stage actors
American male television actors
Living people
People from Port Arthur, Texas
Lamar University alumni
Texas Tech University alumni
Texas State University alumni
20th-century American male actors
21st-century American male actors